Mustafa Sadık Giz (1911, in Aydın – 1979) was a Turkish politician and former chairman of the Turkish sports club Galatasaray.

He was a close relative of political leader and former Turkish prime minister Adnan Menderes. He elected three times as member of national parliament from Democratic Party as deputy of İzmir. In 1957 he was elected as Galatasaray President until 1959. Although there was no national football league established in Turkey in 1950's, Galatasaray won an Istanbul League title, while Giz was the president. He died in 1979.

References
 Başkanlarımız Galatasaray Official website

1911 births
1979 deaths
Galatasaray S.K. presidents
People from Aydın